Didier Claude Deschamps (born 15 October 1968) is a French professional football manager and former player who has been manager of the France national team since 2012. He played as a defensive midfielder for several clubs, in France, Italy, England and Spain, namely Marseille, Juventus, Chelsea and Valencia, as well as Nantes and Bordeaux. Nicknamed "the water-carrier" by former France teammate Eric Cantona, Deschamps was an intelligent and hard-working defensive midfielder who excelled at winning back possession and subsequently starting attacking plays, and also stood out for his leadership throughout his career. As a French international, he was capped on 103 occasions and took part at three UEFA European Football Championships and one FIFA World Cup, captaining his nation to victories in the 1998 World Cup and Euro 2000.

In addition to winning two Ligue 1 titles in 1990 and 1992, Deschamps was part of the Marseille squad that became the first, and so far only, French club to win the UEFA Champions League, a feat which the team achieved in 1993; with the Champions League victory, Deschamps became the youngest captain ever to lead his team to win the title. With Juventus he played three Champions League finals in a row between 1996 and 1998, winning the title in 1996. With the Turin side, he also won the UEFA Super Cup and the Intercontinental Cup, as well as three Serie A titles, among other trophies. With Chelsea, he won the 1999–2000 FA Cup, and also reached another Champions League final with Valencia in 2001, before retiring later that season. After Franz Beckenbauer and followed by Iker Casillas, he was only the second captain in the history of football to have lifted the Champions League trophy, the World Cup trophy, and the European Championship trophy.

As a manager, Deschamps began his career with Monaco, and helped the club to win the Coupe de la Ligue in 2003, and reached the 2004 UEFA Champions League Final, being named Ligue 1 Manager of the Year in 2004. During the 2006–07 season, he helped his former club Juventus win the Serie B title and return to Serie A following their relegation due to their involvement in the 2006 Calciopoli Scandal the previous season. He subsequently managed another one of his former clubs, Marseille, where he won the Ligue 1 title during the 2009–10 season, as well as three consecutive Coupe de la Ligue titles between 2010 and 2012, and consecutive Trophée des Champions titles in 2010 and 2011.

On 8 July 2012, Deschamps was named as the new manager of the French national team. He led the team to the quarter-finals of the 2014 FIFA World Cup, the final of UEFA Euro 2016, victory in the 2018 FIFA World Cup, the last of these making Deschamps the third man to win the World Cup as both a player and a manager, and a back-to-back final appearance in the 2022 FIFA World Cup. Alongside Mário Zagallo and Franz Beckenbauer, Deschamps follows Beckenbauer as only the second to do so as captain.

Club career

Deschamps was born in Bayonne in the French part of the Basque area. After a short passage at rugby in the Biarritz Olympique club, Deschamps started his football career at an amateur club, Aviron Bayonnais whilst still at school. His potential was spotted by scouts from Nantes, for whom he signed in April 1983. Deschamps made his league debut on 27 September 1985. He transferred to Marseille in 1989. Deschamps then spent a season on loan with Bordeaux in 1990, before returning to Marseille. In this second spell with Marseille, Deschamps gained his first honours as a professional player, winning two French league titles in 1991 and 1992, and was a member of the first and only French side to win the Champions League in 1993, becoming the youngest captain ever to lift the trophy in the process.

In 1994, Deschamps joined Italian club Juventus, with whom he won three Serie A titles, one Coppa Italia, two Italian Supercups, as well as his second Champions League title, an UEFA Super Cup, and an Intercontinental Cup in 1996; he also reached two more Champions League finals in his next two seasons, and an UEFA Cup final in 1995. After his spell with Juventus, Deschamps spent a season in England with Chelsea, winning the FA Cup, and scoring once against Hertha BSC in the Champions League. He finished his playing career in Spain, spending a season with Valencia, helping them to the 2001 UEFA Champions League Final, but he remained on the bench as they lost to Bayern Munich. He then retired in the middle of 2001, only 32 years old.

International career

Receiving his first international call-up from Michel Platini on 29 April 1989 against Yugoslavia, Deschamps started his international career in what was a dark time for the France national team as they failed to qualify for the World Cup in both 1990 and 1994, also suffering a first-round elimination at UEFA Euro 1992.

When new team coach Aimé Jacquet began to rebuild the team for Euro 96, he initially selected Manchester United star Eric Cantona as captain. After Cantona earned a year-long suspension in January 1995, the make-up of the team changed dramatically, with veterans Cantona, Jean-Pierre Papin, and David Ginola being dropped in favour of younger players such as Zinedine Zidane. Deschamps, as one of the few remaining veterans, was chosen to lead what would later be called the "Golden Generation". He first captained France in 1996 in a friendly match against Germany as a warmup for Euro 96. During that tournament, held in England, he led them all the way to the semi-finals, their best finish in an international tournament since the 1986 World Cup.

In 1998, Deschamps captained France as they won the 1998 World Cup on home soil in Paris, holding an integral role in the team. Propelled by the momentum of this triumph, Deschamps also captained France as they won Euro 2000, giving them the distinction of being the first national team to hold both the World Cup and Euro titles since West Germany did so in 1974, a feat emulated and surpassed by the Spain national team between 2008 and 2012. Following the tournament, Deschamps announced his retirement from international football, making his second last appearance in a ceremonial match against a FIFA XI in August 2000, which resulted in 5–1 victory. His final appearance was against England. At the time of his retirement Deschamps held the record for the most appearances for France, though this has since been surpassed by Marcel Desailly, Zinedine Zidane and Lilian Thuram. In total, Deschamps earned 103 caps and scored four goals.

Deschamps was named by Pelé as one of the top 125 greatest living footballers in March 2004.

Style of play 
In his position, Deschamps primarily excelled at impeding the opposition's attacking movements as a defensive midfielder, and was capable of subsequently starting up attacking plays and distributing the ball to teammates once he won back possession, leading to him being derisively nicknamed "the water-carrier" by former France teammate Eric Cantona, who implied that Deschamps's primary contribution to the national team was to retrieve the ball and pass it forward to "more talented" players. Deschamps's ability to perform this role was made possible due to his high work-rate, tenacity, stamina, vision, reliable distribution and technique, and his efficacy at pressing and tackling opponents. He also had an excellent positional and organisational sense, and was known for his tactical intelligence, versatility, and his leadership as a footballer.

Managerial career

Monaco
After retiring as a player, he went into football management. He was appointed head coach of Monaco in France's Ligue 1, leading the club to the Coupe de la Ligue title in 2003 and to its first UEFA Champions League final in 2004. He resigned on 19 September 2005 after a poor start to the season, and disagreement with the club's president.

Juventus
On 10 July 2006, Deschamps was named head coach of Juventus, after Fabio Capello resigned in the wake of the Calciopoli match-fixing scandal. Deschamps' first game in charge of Juventus was highly successful since Juventus beat Alessandria 8–0 in a friendly, but poor results followed as Juventus was knocked out in the 3rd round of the Coppa Italia and then drew 1–1 against Rimini on the first day of the league season. In the following three matches, Juventus beat Vicenza 2–1, Crotone 3–0 and Modena 4–0. Deschamps also helped Juventus to win their first competition since being relegated, which was the Birra Moretti Cup in which Juventus beat Internazionale 1–0 and Napoli in a penalty shoot-out. He led Juventus to its return to Serie A, which was confirmed on 19 May 2007 with a 5–1 away win at Arezzo. On 26 May, several media announced Deschamps had resigned as Juventus manager, following several clashes with the club management. However, this was denied by the club itself a few hours later. Later that evening, after the game against Mantova, which confirmed Juve as Serie B champions, Deschamps confirmed to the media that he had indeed resigned and the news was then made official by Juventus a few hours later.

Marseille

On 5 May 2009, it was announced that Deschamps would be named manager of Marseille to the upcoming season which began on 1 July 2009. In his first season, he managed them to their first Ligue 1 title in 18 years. His success had seen the Marseille manager linked to a return to Juventus where former president Giovanni Cobolli Gigli urged the club to bring back Deschamps to replace Ciro Ferrara. Ferrara was eventually replaced by Alberto Zaccheroni. On 29 June 2010, Deschamps signed a contract extension that would keep him at Marseille until June 2012. On 6 June 2011, he extended his contract again, this time until June 2014. On 13 March 2012, his Marseille side progressed to the Champions League quarter-finals for the first time since 1993 by beating Inter Milan. On 14 April 2012, Olympique de Marseille won the Coupe de la Ligue for third time in a row after they beat Lyon 1–0 with Brandão scoring in extra-time. The victory also ended a winless run of 12 matches in all competitions. Deschamps was delighted with Marseille's Coupe de la Ligue triumph and added: "All title wins are beautiful, as they are difficult to achieve. This is the sixth in three years. For a club that had not won anything for 17 years, it is something to be proud of. The credit goes mostly to the players, but I also want to associate my staff with the victory. This is a great source of pride for me, even if it does not change the fact it has been a difficult season in Ligue 1." On 2 July 2012, Deschamps left the club by mutual agreement, citing their poor finish of 10th place in 2011–12.

France
On 8 July 2012, Deschamps was appointed as head coach of the France national football team on a two-year contract, following in the footsteps of Laurent Blanc, who resigned after the UEFA Euro 2012 tournament.

France was placed in UEFA Group I for the qualification phase of the 2014 FIFA World Cup. UEFA Group I contained the defending world champions Spain, plus Belarus, Finland and Georgia. In that group, France earned a 1–1 draw away in the first match against Spain but lost 1–0 at home against the same opponents in the second match. After the 1–0 defeat by Spain, France failed to score a single goal in its next four matches – against Uruguay (friendly, 1–0), Brazil (friendly, 3–0), Belgium (friendly, 0–0) and Georgia (Group I qualifying match, 0–0). France finished second in the group, three points behind Spain, and thus had to win the two-legged play-off tie against Ukraine to advance to the final phase of the tournament. In the first leg held in Kyiv, France was beaten 2–0 by Ukraine. Coming into the second leg, Ukraine had kept eight consecutive clean sheets and had not lost their last 12 matches. In the second leg held at the Stade de France, France beat Ukraine 3–0 to win the tie 3–2 on aggregate and became the first team to overturn a two-goal, first-leg deficit in a FIFA World Cup or UEFA European Championship qualification play-off. France thus qualified for the final phase of the FIFA World Cup for the fifth consecutive time. At the 2014 FIFA World Cup in Brazil, Deschamps's team advanced to the quarter-finals where they lost 1–0 to eventual champions Germany, and Paul Pogba was named Best Young Player of the tournament.

On 20 November 2013, Deschamps extended his contract to coach the France national football team until the UEFA Euro 2016. The extension was triggered under the terms of an agreement reached with the French Football Federation (FFF) when Deschamps replaced Laurent Blanc after the UEFA Euro 2012, whereby qualification for the 2014 FIFA World Cup would earn Deschamps the right to lead France until the Euro 2016 to be held in France.

At Euro 2016, Deschamps led France to the final on 7 July after a brace from Antoine Griezmann helped defeat Germany 2–0. In the final, France were defeated 1–0 after extra time by Portugal.

On 31 October 2017, Deschamps signed a new contract until 2020.

For the 2018 FIFA World Cup, Deschamps "was careful in selecting his 23-man roster for Russia, selecting only players who he felt could gel as a cohesive unit", resulting in the omission of Real Madrid’s Karim Benzema. Although initially criticized for conservative tactics as the national team had indifferent showings to advance from the group stage with narrow wins over Australia and Peru and a draw against Denmark, they put in dominant performances during the knockout rounds, defeating Argentina 4–3 in the round of 16, and Uruguay 2–0 in the quarter-finals to reach the semi-finals. During the tournament, Deschamps also deployed Blaise Matuidi – normally a holding midfielder – out of position, playing him out wide, rather than in the centre, as a left-sided winger or attacking midfielder in a 4–2–3–1 formation. In this system, Matuidi proved to be equally effective, in spite of his unorthodox playing role, as he was able to track back and limit the attacking threat of the opposing full-backs on the flank. Moreover, he also often tucked into the centre, in order to help support Paul Pogba and N'Golo Kanté defensively, which also helped minimise the amount of space given to the main playmakers of France's opponents throughout the tournament, and ultimately helped to nullify their impact on the game in midfield. Furthermore, Matuidi's more defensive role on the left flank provided balance within the team, as it in turn gave Kylian Mbappé the licence to attack and run at defences from the right wing. Following these matches, France became World Cup winners after beating Belgium 1–0 in the semi-final and Croatia 4–2 in the final. As such, Deschamps became only the third man after Mário Zagallo and Franz Beckenbauer to win the World Cup as both a player and a manager, and only the second captain after Beckenbauer to do so.

In December 2019, Deschamps signed a new contract with France, keeping him with the national team until World Cup 2022. At the Euro 2020, France were knocked out on penalties by Switzerland in the round of 16, following a 3–3 draw. Deschamps was criticized for getting his team selections and tactics wrong. In the 2022 World Cup, he led France to reach their second final in a row, which they lost 4–2 on penalties to Argentina after a 3–3 draw. In January 2023, he extended his contract with France until June 2026.

Personal life
Deschamps married Claude Antoinette in 1989. Together they have a son, Dylan, who was born in 1996. He was raised a Catholic. Deschamps' brother Philippe died in a plane crash when Deschamps' was 19 years old which he said has "marked [his] life".

He is first cousins with retired professional tennis player and Wimbledon 1998 finalist Nathalie Tauziat.

Career statistics

Club

International

Scores and results list France's goal tally first, score column indicates score after each Deschamps goal.

Managerial statistics

Honours

Player
Marseille
Division 1: 1989–90, 1991–92
UEFA Champions League: 1992–93

Juventus
Serie A: 1994–95, 1996–97, 1997–98
Coppa Italia: 1994–95
Supercoppa Italiana: 1995, 1997
Intercontinental Cup: 1996
UEFA Champions League: 1995–96
UEFA Champions League: Runner-up: 1996–97, 1997–98
UEFA Cup: Runner-up: 1994–95
UEFA Intertoto Cup: 1999
UEFA Super Cup: 1996

Chelsea
FA Cup: 1999–2000

Valencia
UEFA Champions League: Runner-up: 2000–01

France
FIFA World Cup: 1998
UEFA European Championship: 2000

Individual
Division 1 Rookie of the Year: 1989
French Player of the Year: 1996
UEFA European Championship Team of the Tournament: 1996
FIFA 100: 2004
The Dream Team 110 years of OM: 2010
Golden Foot Award Legends: 2018
9th French Player of the Century

Manager
Monaco
Coupe de la Ligue: 2002–03
UEFA Champions League runner-up: 2003–04

Juventus
Serie B: 2006–07

Marseille
Ligue 1: 2009–10
Coupe de la Ligue: 2009–10, 2010–11, 2011–12
Trophée des Champions: 2010, 2011

France
FIFA World Cup: 2018; runner-up: 2022
UEFA Nations League: 2020–21
UEFA European Championship runner-up: 2016

Individual
Ligue 1 Manager of the Year: 2004
The Best FIFA Football Coach: 2018
Globe Soccer Awards Coach of the Year: 2018
World Soccer Magazine World Manager of the Year: 2018
IFFHS World's Best National Coach: 2018, 2020

Orders
Knight of the Legion of Honour: 1998
Officer of the Legion of Honour: 2018

Notes

See also
 List of men's footballers with 100 or more international caps

References

Further reading

External links

Didier Deschamps at Premier League

 
 

1968 births
Living people
French-Basque people
Sportspeople from Bayonne
French footballers
Association football midfielders
Aviron Bayonnais FC players
FC Nantes players
Olympique de Marseille players
FC Girondins de Bordeaux players
Juventus F.C. players
Chelsea F.C. players
Valencia CF players
Ligue 1 players
Serie A players
Premier League players
La Liga players
FA Cup Final players
UEFA Champions League winning players
France under-21 international footballers
France international footballers
UEFA Euro 1992 players
UEFA Euro 1996 players
1998 FIFA World Cup players
UEFA Euro 2000 players
FIFA World Cup-winning players
FIFA World Cup-winning captains
UEFA European Championship-winning players
UEFA European Championship-winning captains
FIFA Century Club
FIFA 100
French expatriate footballers
French expatriate sportspeople in Italy
French expatriate sportspeople in England
French expatriate sportspeople in Spain
Expatriate footballers in Italy
Expatriate footballers in England
Expatriate footballers in Spain
French football managers
AS Monaco FC managers
Juventus F.C. managers
Olympique de Marseille managers
France national football team managers
Ligue 1 managers
Serie B managers
2014 FIFA World Cup managers
UEFA Euro 2016 managers
2018 FIFA World Cup managers
UEFA Euro 2020 managers
FIFA World Cup-winning managers
UEFA Nations League-winning managers
French expatriate football managers
French expatriate sportspeople in Monaco
Expatriate football managers in Italy
Expatriate football managers in Monaco
Chevaliers of the Légion d'honneur
Officiers of the Légion d'honneur
Footballers from Nouvelle-Aquitaine
2022 FIFA World Cup managers